UHV may refer to:

 Ultra-high vacuum, the vacuum regime characterised by pressures lower than about 10−7 pascal
 Ultra-high voltage, a classification of overhead power line with an operating voltage of higher than 800 kV
 University of Houston–Victoria, a university in Victoria, Texas, US